The Grob GF 200 was a business aircraft of unorthodox design developed in Germany during the 1990s.

Design and development
The GF 200 was a low-wing cantilever monoplane with retractable tricycle undercarriage and a highly streamlined fuselage. The engine was mounted within the fuselage, to the rear of the passenger cabin, and drove the pusher propeller via a driveshaft. The GF 200 has a T-tail, but also a large ventral fin beneath the fuselage. Like other Grob designs, construction throughout was of composite materials, in the case of this particular aircraft, including the driveshaft.

Development commenced in 1983 but was postponed due to concerns about achieving certification for the composite design. However, with financial support from the German government, development commenced in earnest by the end of the decade. The project officially launched at the Hannover Show in May 1988, at which a mockup of the design was displayed and a hope expressed to have the aircraft flying within two years.

Operational history

As it transpired, the prototype was rolled out in March 1991, in the hope of a first flight by May, and which finally took place on 26 November.
The aircraft made its first public appearance at the Berlin Air Show in 1992. Initial flight tests revealed problems with engine cooling and excessive noise. The former concern was addressed by a redesign of the engine air intakes.

The prototype was intended as a test aircraft and technology demonstrator, and lacked many of the refinements that would have been incorporated into a production aircraft, including cabin pressurisation, de-icing equipment, and even a complete cabin interior. When Grob was unable to find financial backing to take the design further, the company embarked on the construction of a more "true-to-life" prototype in 1997, the GF 250, in the belief that this would prove more attractive to potential business partners.

Further planned developments included the turboshaft-powered GF 300, and the GF 350 with twin turboshaft engines driving a common propeller.

Specifications (GF 200)

See also

References

Citations

Bibliography

 
 
 
 
 
 
 
 
 
 
 

GF200
1990s German business aircraft
Single-engined pusher aircraft
Low-wing aircraft
Aircraft first flown in 1991